Mapping the World is a French programme that explains geopolitical contexts using maps as visual support. It was created in 1990 by political scientist Jean-Christophe Victor, who hosted it up until his death in 2016. The programme returned in September 2017 with Émilie Aubry as host and airs weekly on the Franco-German channel Arte.

Programming and format

The show was first aired from 1990 to 1992, on La Sept until it stopped broadcasting, and has been on air since 1992 on the Franco-German channel Arte. The show is broadcast every Saturday at 20h00 (Paris local time, UTC+1) and rebroadcast several times a week. The format of the show has changed little since the first episode. However, the episode length expanded from 7 to 11 minutes. The transition from 11 to 26 minutes referred to by Jean-Christophe Victor in 2002 was abandoned.

Structure of the show

In general, the show runs as follows:
Generic top
Introduction – the presenter introduces the topic of the show on a neutral background
Development – maps, animations and sometimes pictures while the presenter talks.
Conclusion – the presenter concludes the program on a neutral point of view
Bibliography of books which served as sources and / or may give the viewer further insight into the topic
End Credits

Maps and visualization methods

Topographic maps are based on the Ordnance Survey Oxford Cartographers. The most commonly used map projection is that of Eckert (the Pseudo-cylindrical projection). The show also uses satellite imagery from Google Earth and the first use was in the episode named: "Nigeria, rich state poor country."

Program production cycle

The Laboratoire d'études politiques et d'analyses cartographiques (LEPAC) produces about forty episodes a year for the channel Arte. The subjects for most episodes are decided a year in advance to allow time for production. This delay in the selection of themes allows a certain hindsight regarding the chosen topic. However, on occasion, the topic of an episode is more closely related to current events. For example, the episode "Tsunami, a natural phenomenon" aired just three months after the events in South-East Asia.

Subjects of the show

Of the 300 programs (from March 2001 to May 2008), 210 (70%) have a geographical approach and 84 (28%) have a thematic approach. 6 issues remain unclassifiable: introspective (ex: "La Methode le Dessous des Cartes") or dreamers (ex: "A journey with Corto Maltese, Turkey to Samarkand").
For information and the geographical most commonly accepted:
Africa (29)
Latin America (21)
Anglo-Saxon America (12)
Europe (53)
Polar worlds (11)
Central Asia (10)
East Asia (35)
Middle East (36)
Oceania (1)
Anecdote: The issue of 29 March 2000, for the week of April 1, is a parody of the show itself. The producing team of the show made what could be the episode of 1 April 3000 by offering a retrospective view of the past thousand years.

Methods and objectives

In a special 10th birthday episode named "La méthode du Dessous des Cartes", the aims of the show were outlined:
Give way to Geography
Give meaning through History
Cross disciplines
Everything is connected
Avoid Ethnocentrism
Giving a try at Futures studies
Take a stand
The main, oft repeated aim of the show is "to understand rather than to inform."

Positions

The main positions of the show and its sponsors are as follows: in favor of Human rights, Sustainable development, and the Proposals for a Palestinian state, and against the concepts of Ethnic cleansing, Just War and The Clash of Civilizations (as suggested for example by Samuel P. Huntington).

Awards

Prix Encyclopædia Universalis 1995
Grand Prix Video 1996 of the Académie Charles Cros
La Clio de l'image 1997

Publications

Books
Jean-Christophe Victor, Frank Tétart and Virginie Raisson, Le Dessous des cartes : Atlas géopolitique, map of Frederick Lernoud, ed. Arte and Tallandier, 2005,.
Jean-Christophe Victor, Frank Tétart and Virginie Raisson, Le Dessous des cartes 2 : Tome 2, Atlas d'un monde qui change, map of Lernoud Frederick, ed. Arte and Tallandier, 2007,.
Jean-Christophe Victor, Frank Tétart and Virginie Raisson, Le Dessous des Cartes : Coffret en 2 volumes : Atlas géopolitique ; Atlas d'un monde qui change, map of Lernoud Frederick, ed. Arte and Tallandier, 2008.

DVD
Each semester, Arte Video and LEPAC publish a DVD. The DVD includes 12 to 20 episodes of the show regarding a theme. DVDs released so far:
Latin America, the other America;
African continent;
The unity of China;
USA, an imperialistic geography;
Geopolitics and Religion;
Europe, a model geopolitics?;
Europe as an alternative?;
Polar worlds;
Middle East geopolitical pivot;
A planet in relief.

Textbooks
Le dessous des cartes Terminale : L’espace mondial
Le dessous des cartes Première : L’Europe et la France
Le dessous des cartes Seconde : Les Hommes occupent et aménagent la Terre
Le dessous des cartes Troisième : Le Monde d’aujourd’hui

References

External links
 
 
 

arte video on demand (artevod.com)
Lepac the Center for Political Studies and Cartographic Analysis - author of the text

German documentary television series
French documentary television series
1990 French television series debuts
1990 German television series debuts
1990s French television series
1990s German television series
2000s French television series
2000s German television series
2010s French television series
2010s German television series
Works about geography